Longitarsus aeneicollis is a species of beetle in the flea beetle subfamily that can be found everywhere in Europe (except for Albania, Iceland, Ireland, Estonia, Finland, Liechtenstein, Norway, and Slovenia).

References

A
Beetles described in 1837
Beetles of Europe